Girolamo Ruggieri (1662–1717) was an Italian painter of the Baroque period.  Painted in Verona, specializing in landscapes and battle paintings.

References

1662 births
1717 deaths
17th-century Italian painters
Italian male painters
18th-century Italian painters
Painters from Verona
Italian Baroque painters
Italian battle painters
18th-century Italian male artists